Onchocerca gibsoni is a species of nematodes belonging to the family Onchocercidae.

The species is found in Australia.

References

Spirurida
Taxa named by John Burton Cleland
Taxa described in 1910